Bravissimo may refer to:

 Bravissimo (film), a 1955 Italian film
 Bravissimo (company), a British lingerie company
 Fiat Bravissimo, the Japanese name for the Fiat Bravo/Brava